Serowe Airport  was an airport serving the town of Serowe, Botswana.  The airport is closed.

References

Defunct airports